Georgia Beers is an American writer of lesbian romance. Her novel Fresh Tracks won the Lambda Literary Award for Lesbian Romance.

Her novels have won 13 of the Golden Crown Literary Society's Goldie Awards, including six awards for romance, two Ann Bannon Popular Choice awards, two awards for non-erotic short story collections, and two awards for erotica.

Personal life 
Beers has lived in Rochester, New York her entire life and currently has a miniature Australian Shepherd, Finley.

Every year, she volunteers on the programming committee for ImageOut, Rochester, New York's annual LGBTQ film festival.

Awards

Publications 

 Turning the Page (2001)
 Thy Neighbor's Wife (2003)
 Fresh Tracks (2006)
 Too Close to Touch (2006)
 Mine (2007)
 Finding Home (2008)
 Starting from Scratch (2010)
 96 Hours (2011)
 Slices of Life (2012)
 Justice (2013)
 Working Girls #1: Firefighter (2013)
 Olive Oil and White Bread (2014)
 Snow Globe (2014)
 A Little Bit of Spice (2015)
 Zero Visibility (2015)
 Right Here, Right Now (2017)
 What Matters Most (2017)
 Blend (2018)
 Calendar Girl (2018)
 The Shape of You (2018)
 The Do-Over (2019)
 Fear of Falling (2019)
 One Walk in Winter (2019)
 16 Steps to Forever (2020)
 Flavor of the Month (2020)
 Hopeless Romantic (2020)
 The Secret Poet (2021)

Anthology contributions 

 The Milk of Human Kindness, edited by Lori L. Lake  (2004)
 Stolen Moments, edited by Radclyffe and Stacia Seaman (2005)
 Extreme Passions, edited by Radclyffe and Stacia Seaman (2006)
 Blue Collar Lesbian Erotica, edited by Pat Cronin and Verda Foster (2008)
 Girls Next Door, edited by Sandy Lowe  and  Stacia Seaman  (2017)

Balance series 

 Balance (2014)
 Balance, Episode 2 (2014)

Puppy Love Romance series 

 Rescued Heart (2016)
 Run To You (2016)
 Dare to Stay (2017)

Short story collections 

 Outsiders, with Lynn Ames, J.D. Glass, Susan X. Meagher, and Susan Smith (2010)
 Call of The Wilde and Other Short Stories (2012)
 All I Want for Christmas, with Maggie Cummings and Fiona Riley (2020)

The Swizzle Stick Romance series 

 Shaken or Stirred (2021)
 On the Rocks (2021)
 With a Twist (2022)

References 

American lesbian writers
American LGBT writers
Writers from Rochester, New York
Lambda Literary Award winners
Year of birth unknown
Living people
21st-century American writers
Year of birth missing (living people)